Saint Trudpert (d.  607 or 644) was a missionary in Germany in the seventh century. He is generally called a Celtic monk from Ireland, but some consider him a German.

Life
According to legend, he went first to Rome in order to receive from the pope authority for his mission. Returning from Italy he travelled along the Rhine to the country of the Alamanni in the Breisgau.

Trudpert cleared off the trees and built a cell and a little church which later Bishop Martinus of Constance dedicated to Sts. Peter and Paul. Here Trudpert led an ascetic and laborious life. 

According to a now discounted tradition, one day when he was asleep he was murdered under a pine by one of the serfs whom Otbert had given him, in revenge for severe tasks imposed. Otbert gave Trudpert an honourable burial. The Benedictine Abbey of St. Trudpert (:de:St. Trudpert) was built in the next century on the spot where Trudpert was buried. The story of his life is so full of legendary details that no correct judgment can be formed of Trudpert's era, the kind of work he did, or of its success. The period when he lived in the Breisgau was formerly given as 640-643; Baur gives 607 as the year of his death. The day of his death is 26 April.

Veneration
In 815 his bones were translated and the first biography of him was written; this biography was revised in the tenth and thirteenth centuries. His reliquary came finally to the abbey church of St. Trudpert and parts are held in the Ettenheimmünster monastery.

See also
 Saint Trudpert, patron saint archive

References

External links

Catholic Online: St. Trudpert
 Benedictine Abbey of St. Trudpert
 http://www.kloster-st-trudpert.de/

Medieval German saints
German hermits
7th-century deaths
7th-century Christian saints
Year of birth unknown